(born 9 January 1953 in Usuki, Ōita) is a retired long-distance runner from Japan, who represented his native country at two Summer Olympics: 1976 and 1984. He won the 1985 edition of the Tokyo Marathon. His twin brother Takeshi So is also a retired Olympic marathoner, and finished fourth in Los Angeles, California (1984).

Some road racing authorities consider his winning run at the Beppu-Ōita Marathon in 1978 (2:09:05.6) to have been a marathon world best.

Achievements
All results regarding marathon, unless stated otherwise

Notes

References

External links
 1986 Year Ranking

 

1953 births
Living people
Japanese male long-distance runners
Japanese male marathon runners
Athletes (track and field) at the 1976 Summer Olympics
Athletes (track and field) at the 1984 Summer Olympics
Olympic athletes of Japan
Japanese twins
Sportspeople from Ōita Prefecture
Twin sportspeople
Identical twins